Government Kalidas Girls College, Ujjain -- also known by the shorter names as Kalidas Girls College, Ujjain or Kalidas College -- is a Girls government degree college located in Ujjain, Madhya Pradesh, India. It is recognized by the University Grants Commission (UGC) and affiliated to Vikram University. it is accredited A grade by the National Assessment and Accreditation Council (NAAC)

References

External links
 

Commerce colleges in India
Science colleges in India
Universities and colleges in Madhya Pradesh
Education in Ujjain
Educational institutions established in 1980
1980 establishments in Madhya Pradesh